Tørdal is a district in Drangedal municipality, in the county Vestfold og Telemark, Norway.

Valleys of Vestfold og Telemark